RLL may refer to:

 Run Length Limited, an encoding scheme for disk drives
 Relay Ladder Logic, a programming language for industrial control
 Radio Local Loop, same as Wireless Local Loop (WLL)
 Rahal Letterman Lanigan Racing, an auto racing team in the WeatherTech SportsCar Championship
 right lower lobe, see List of medical abbreviations: R